The 2011 Formula 3 Sudamericana season was the 25th Formula 3 Sudamericana season. It began on 21 March 2011, in Velopark, and ended on 17 December at Autódromo Internacional Orlando Moura in Campo Grande.

In year most complicated of the category, Fabiano Machado dominated the Championship, winning 17 of the 25 races in a season where only he and one other driver, Ronaldo Freitas, competed in every race. Bruno Bonifacio dominated the Sudamericana Class B, winning 12 races.

Drivers and teams
 All cars are powered by Berta engines, and will run on Pirelli tyres. All teams were Brazilian-registered.

Notes:
 Leandro Florenzo and Felipe Guimarães competed in partnership.
 Luiz Boesel and Suzane Carvlalho also competed in partnership.
 Due to the short grid, some drivers of other categories were guest for Sunday race.

Race calendar and results

Championship standings

Class A standings

Class B standings

References

External links
 The official website of the Formula Three Sudamericana

Formula 3 Sudamericana
Sudamericana
Formula 3 Sudamericana seasons
Sudamericana F3